Jayachamarajapura Chandrashekaraiah Madhuswamy is an Indian politician who is the current Minister of Law, Parliamentary affairs and Legislation and Minor Irrigation of Karnataka from 20 August 2019. He is a current member of the Karnataka Legislative Assembly representing Chikkanayakanahalli Constituency. Madhu Swamy belongs to Bharatiya Janata Party.He is still staying in his village, J C Pura, he does not have house either in Bengaluru or Tumkuru and known for simplicity.

References

Living people
People from Tumkur district
Bharatiya Janata Party politicians from Karnataka
Karnataka MLAs 2018–2023
1953 births